David Gerard M. Humble (born 6 March 1967 in Dumfries, Dumfries and Galloway, United Kingdom) is a retired male badminton player from Canada.

Career
Humble competed in badminton at the 1992 Summer Olympics in men's singles. He lost in the first round to Darren Hall, of Great Britain, 15–6, 15–4.

References
sports-reference.com
tournamentsoftware.com

Living people
Canadian male badminton players
Badminton players at the 1992 Summer Olympics
Olympic badminton players of Canada
1967 births
Commonwealth Games medallists in badminton
Commonwealth Games silver medallists for Canada
Badminton players at the 1990 Commonwealth Games
Medallists at the 1990 Commonwealth Games